"Suzanne" (titled as "Susanna" for the English version) is a single by Dutch band VOF de Kunst, also known as The Art Company, released in 1984.

The song reached number one on the Single Top 100 in the Netherlands, and No. 12 in the United Kingdom.

Formats and track listings
7" single
"Suzanne" – 4:41
"Het voordeel van de twijfel" – 3:32

Charts

Ricky Martin version

Ricky Martin recorded a Spanish-language version of "Suzanne", titled "Susana". It was included on his debut solo album Ricky Martin, and released as a single in 1992. A music video was also released.

Track listing
Latin America promotional 12" single
"Susana" – 4:54

Charts

Other versions
In 1984, Kosovo-Albanian singer Naser Gjinovci from the band Minatori recorded an Albanian-language version of "Suzanne", called "Mihane".

In 1984, Adriano Celentano released the album I miei americani ("My Americans"), which consisted of Italian-language covers of mostly American hits, along with "Suzanne" by VOF de Kunst and "Michelle" by the Beatles.

In 1985, Tzimis Panousis, a Greek Alternative Rock-Singer and Comedian, released a comedy version of this song in Greek language. His version was not about a marred date, but a marred visit in the brothel.

In 1997, Serbian singer Igor Starović from the band "Divlji kesten" recorded a Serbian-language version of "Suzanne", called "Suzana".

Colombian singer Luis Javier Piedrahita Gaviria (Fausto) recorded "Susana" in 1985 with Hispavox, which was popular in the eighties in Latin America.

The Tamil-language song "Oh Sona" from the Indian film Vaali (1999) is unofficially based on "Suzanne".

References

1983 songs
1983 singles
Dutch pop songs
Reggae fusion songs
1992 singles
Ricky Martin songs
CBS Records singles
Sony Discos singles